Karl John Geary (born 31 May 1972) is an Irish-born American actor and author.

Early life
Geary was born in Dublin. In 1987, at the age of 15, he moved to the United States; he later obtained a green card in a visa lottery for undocumented Irish immigrants, and ultimately became a naturalized citizen.

Career
Geary appeared in Madonna's Sex book. His acting roles include Sex and the City, Hysteria – The Def Leppard Story, and Hamlet (2000). He wrote and appeared in Coney Island Baby (2003). He appeared as Coffey in the 2008 horror film The Burrowers. He owns a bar in downtown Manhattan called the Scratcher, and previously co-owned another club, the original tiny Cafe Sin-é on St. Mark's Place in the East Village, where he waited on tables alongside Jeff Buckley.

Personal life
Geary has seven siblings. In 2003, he married Scottish actress Laura Fraser. They have one daughter, Lila, and live in Glasgow, Scotland. Geary also has a son, Billy.

Filmography

Film

Television

Publications
 Montpelier Parade 2017

References

External links
 

1972 births
20th-century American male actors
21st-century American male actors
American male film actors
American male screenwriters
American male stage actors
American male television actors
Irish emigrants to the United States
Living people
Male actors from Dublin (city)
Naturalized citizens of the United States
Undocumented immigrants to the United States